The Four Seasons is a ballet choreographed by New York City Ballet ballet master Jerome Robbins to excerpts from Giuseppe Verdi's I Vespri Siciliani (1855), I Lombardi (1843), and Il Trovatore (1853). The premiere took place on 18 January 1979 at the New York State Theater, Lincoln Center, with scenery and costumes by Santo Loquasto and lighting by Jennifer Tipton.

Original cast

Lucinda Murdoch
Eliana Dipietro
Elli Trimble
Stephanie Saland
Maria Calegari
Patricia McBride
David Richardson
Joseph Duell

Peter Frame
Francis Sackett
Daniel Duell
Bart Cook
Mikhail Baryshnikov
Jean-Pierre Frohlich
Gerard Ebitz

Other companies 
 Perm Opera and Ballet Theatre, premiered April 13, 2007 along with The Concert.

References 

 
Playbill, NYCB, Tuesday, April 29, 2008

Repertory Week, NYCB, Spring Season, 2008 repertory, week 1

Articles 
NY Times, Jack Anderson, January 14, 1979

Reviews 

 
NY Times, Alastair Macaulay, January 21, 2008

NY Times, Jack Anderson, June 4, 1985
NY Times, Anna Kisselgoff, January 20, 1979

Ballets by Jerome Robbins
Ballets to the music of Giuseppe Verdi
1979 ballet premieres
Ballets designed by Jennifer Tipton
Ballets designed by Santo Loquasto
New York City Ballet repertory